Hernán Novick (born 13 December 1988 in Montevideo) is a Uruguayan footballer. His nickname is Sensei. He plays as an attacking midfielder for Boston River.

Family
Novick is the son of businessman and politician Edgardo Novick and the brother of footballer Marcel Novick.

References

External links
 
 
 Hernán Novick – Tenfield Digital 

1988 births
Living people
Footballers from Montevideo
Uruguayan footballers
Association football midfielders
El Tanque Sisley players
Villa Española players
Centro Atlético Fénix players
Peñarol players
Club Guaraní players
Cerro Porteño players
Club Sol de América footballers
Uruguayan Primera División players
Paraguayan Primera División players
Uruguayan expatriate sportspeople in Paraguay
Expatriate footballers in Paraguay